The 1999 French Open was a tennis tournament that took place on the outdoor clay courts at the Stade Roland Garros in Paris, France. The tournament was held from 24 May until 6 June. It was the 103rd staging of the French Open, and the second Grand Slam tennis event of 1999.

Seniors

Men's singles

 Andre Agassi defeated  Andrei Medvedev, 1–6, 2–6, 6–4, 6–3, 6–4
• It was Agassi's 4th career Grand Slam singles title and his 1st and only title at the French Open.

Women's singles

 Steffi Graf defeated  Martina Hingis, 4–6, 7–5, 6–2
• It was Graf's 22nd and last career Grand Slam singles title and her 6th title at the French Open.

Men's doubles

 Mahesh Bhupathi /  Leander Paes defeated  Goran Ivanišević /  Jeff Tarango, 6–2, 7–5
• It was Bhupathi's 1st career Grand Slam doubles title.
• It was Paes' 1st career Grand Slam doubles title.

Women's doubles

 Serena Williams /  Venus Williams defeated  Martina Hingis /  Anna Kournikova, 6–3, 6–7(2–7), 8–6
• It was S. Williams' 1st career Grand Slam doubles title.
• It was V. Williams' 1st career Grand Slam doubles title.

Mixed doubles

 Katarina Srebotnik /  Piet Norval defeated  Larisa Neiland /  Rick Leach, 6–3, 3–6, 6–3
• It was Srebotnik's 1st career Grand Slam mixed doubles title.
• It was Norval's 1st and only career Grand Slam mixed doubles title.

Juniors

Boys' singles

 Guillermo Coria def.  David Nalbandian, 6–4, 6–3

Girls' singles

 Lourdes Domínguez Lino defeated  Stéphanie Foretz, 6–4, 6–4

Boys' doubles

 Irakli Labadze /  Lovro Zovko defeated  Kristian Pless /  Olivier Rochus, 6–1, 7–6

Girls' doubles

 Flavia Pennetta /  Roberta Vinci defeated  Mia Buric /  Kim Clijsters, 7–5, 5–7, 6–4

Singles players

Men's singles
Men's singles

Notes

External links
 French Open official website

 
1999 in French tennis
1999 in Paris